Sir Konstantin Sergeevich Novoselov  (born  1974) is a Russian-British physicist, and a professor at the Centre for Advanced 2D Materials, National University of Singapore. He is also the Langworthy Professor in the School of Physics and Astronomy at the University of Manchester. His work on graphene with Andre Geim earned them the Nobel Prize in Physics in 2010.

Education 
Konstantin Novoselov was born in Nizhny Tagil, Soviet Union, in 1974. He graduated from the Moscow Institute of Physics and Technology with a MSc degree in 1997, and was awarded a PhD from the Radboud University of Nijmegen in 2004 for work supervised by Andre Geim.

Konstantin Novoselov uses the nickname "Kostya" (diminutive of the name Konstantin).

Career 

Novoselov has published 376 peer-reviewed research papers on several topics including mesoscopic superconductivity (Hall magnetometry) as of June 22, 2018, subatomic movements of magnetic domain walls, the discovery of gecko tape and graphene.,

Kostya Novoselov participated in the Graphene Flagship project – a €1 billion initiative of the European Commission – and was featured in the official promotion movie of the project.

Novoselov was the first Director of the National Graphene Institute  and sits on the International Scientific Advisory Committee of Australia's ARC Centre of Excellence in Future Low-Energy Electronics Technologies.

Novoselov was also a recipient of a starting grant from the European Research Council.

Kostya Novoselov made it into a shortlist of scientists with multiple hot papers for the years 2007–2008 (shared second place with 13 hot papers) and 2009 (5th place with 12 hot papers).

In 2014 Kostya Novoselov was included in the list of the most highly cited researchers. He was also named among the 17 hottest researchers worldwide—"individuals who have published the greatest number of hot papers during 2012–2013".

Novoselov joined the National University of Singapore's Centre for Advanced 2D Materials in 2019, making him the first Nobel laureate to join a Singaporean university.

Awards and honours 

 2007 Nicholas Kurti European Science Prize "to promote and recognise the novel work of young scientists working in the fields of Low Temperatures and/or High Magnetic Fields."
 2008 Technology Review-35 Young Innovator
 2008 University of Manchester Researcher of the Year.
 2008 Europhysics Prize, jointly with Geim, "for discovering and isolating a single free-standing atomic layer of carbon (graphene) and elucidating its remarkable electronic properties.",

 2008 International Union of Pure and Applied Physics Young Scientist Prize, "for his contribution in the discovery of graphene and for pioneering studies of its extraordinary properties."
 2010 Nobel Prize in Physics, jointly with Andre Geim, "for groundbreaking experiments regarding the material graphene." Novoselov was the youngest Nobel laureate in physics since Brian Josephson in 1973, and in any field since Rigoberta Menchú (Peace) in 1992.
 2010 Knight Commander of the Order of the Netherlands Lion
 2010 Honorary Fellow of the Royal Society of Chemistry (HonFRSC)
 2010 Honorary Professor of Moscow Institute of Physics and Technology
 2011 Honorary Doctorate from the University of Manchester
 2011 Honorary Fellow of the Institute of Physics (HonFInstP)
 2011 Elected Fellow of the Royal Society (FRS)
 2011 W. L. Bragg Lecture Prize from the International Union of Crystallography "… for his work on two-dimensional atomic crystals”
 2012 Knight Bachelor in the 2012 New Year Honours for services to science.,
 2012 Chosen among "Britain's 50 New Radicals" by NESTA and The Observer
 2012 The Kohn Prize Lecture “…for development of new class of materials: two-dimensional atomic crystals”
 2013 Appointed Langworthy Professor of Physics, University of Manchester
 2013 Leverhulme Medal (Royal Society) "…for revolutionary work on graphene, other two-dimensional crystals and their heterostructures that has great potential for a number of applications, from electronics to energy"
 2013 Awarded Honorary Freedom of the City of Manchester "for his groundbreaking work on graphene", see List of Freedom of the City recipients
 2013 Elected a foreign member of the Bulgarian Academy of Sciences
 2014 2nd place in the Discovery Section of the National Science Photography Competition.
 2014 included in a list of the most highly cited researchers. He was also named among the 17 hottest researchers worldwide – "individuals who have published the greatest number of hot papers during 2012–2013".
 2014 awarded the Onsager Medal.
 2015 elected to be a member of the Academia Europaea.
 2016 awarded the Carbon Medal. 
 2016 awarded the Dalton Medal.
 2019 elected a foreign associate of the US National Academy of Sciences
 2019 elected to be a member of the Asia Pacific Academy of Materials
 2019 Otto Warburg Prize and Lecture by The Otto Warburg Chemistry Foundation "for the discovery of the unusual quantum properties of one atom thick two-dimensional materials"
 2022  awarded John von Neumann Professor title. The title is awarded jointly by the Budapest University of Technology and Economics (BME) and the John von Neumann Computer Society

His certificate of election to the Royal Society in 2011 reads

National Graphene Institute
Novoselov led the academic team which overviewed the design, construction and launching of the National Graphene Institute. He contributed with a number of unique architectural and technical solutions. The veil of the National Graphene Institute depicts formulae from his and Prof. A. Geim early works on graphene. Also, Novoselov confirms that among the formulae several scientific jokes are hidden, though he has never revealed them.

He co-authored a book on the architecture of the National Graphene Institute.

Other projects
In 2018, in a project of exploration of the archives of the Jodrell Bank Observatory, Prof. Novoselov helped Prof. Tim O'Brian to transcribe radio transmission (most possibly simulated instrument reading) from the Soviet Zond 6 received by radio telescope at Jodrell Bank Observatory in November 1968.,

Art involvement
Novoselov is known for his interest in art. He practices in Chinese traditional drawing and has been involved in several projects on modern art. 
Thus, in February 2015 he combined forces with Cornelia Parker to create a display for the opening of the Whitworth Art Gallery. Cornelia Parker's meteorite shower firework (pieces of meteorites loaded in firework) was launched by Novoselov breathing on graphene gas sensor (which changed the resistance of graphene due to doping by water vapour). Graphene was obtained through exfoliation of graphite which was extracted from a drawing of William Blake. Novoselov suggested that he also exfoliated graphite obtained from the drawings of other prominent artists: John Constable, Pablo Picasso, J. M. W. Turner, Thomas Girtin. He said that only microscopic amounts (flake size less than 100 micrometres) was extracted from each of the drawings. In 2015 he participated in "in conversation" session with Douglas Gordon during Interdependence session at Manchester International Festival.

He also participates in discussions on the relation between art and science. Novoselov believes that artists and scientists both rely on curiosity, willingness to learn and imagination:

Novoselov is fond of Chinese calligraphy and drawing. He learned it from a prominent Chinese artist Zheng Shenglong. Nine ink paintings by Prof. Novoselov were shown at the exhibition "Britain Through the Eyes of a Chinese Diplomat" at the University of Leeds.
One of his paintings is now in the collection of President of China Xi Jinping.

Novoselov participated in Viennacontemporary in 2017, where 5 of his works have been presented by RDI.Creative gallery. The paintings presented a range of topics, from the very traditional Chinese paintings to landscapes to contemporary subjects. It is claimed that graphene ink has been used in at least some of those paintings.

Personal life
Novoselov holds both Russian and British citizenship. He is married and has two daughters. He is an agnostic.

Political positions 
In February 2022, he signed an open letter by Russian scientists condemning the 2022 Russian invasion of Ukraine.

References

External links 

 Interview in ScienceWatch on his research fields
 Portrait of Novoselov and Geim following the announcement of the Nobel Prize
 Selected research papers by Konstantin Novoselov and Andre Geim
 Russians scoop Nobel for creation of graphene
 Kostya Novoselov's art website
 

1974 births
People from Nizhny Tagil
British physicists
Russian physicists
British Nobel laureates
Russian emigrants to the United Kingdom
Russian Nobel laureates
Nobel laureates in Physics
Living people
Russian activists against the 2022 Russian invasion of Ukraine
Russian agnostics
Russian inventors
Moscow Institute of Physics and Technology alumni
Academics of the University of Manchester
Knights Bachelor
Fellows of the Royal Society
Graphene
Carbon scientists
British nanotechnologists
Russian nanotechnologists
Naturalised citizens of the United Kingdom
21st-century British inventors
Foreign associates of the National Academy of Sciences
Recipients of the Dalton Medal